Marian Heffernan (born 16 April 1982) is an Irish athlete who competed in the women's 4 × 400 metres relay at the 2012 Summer Olympics. Heffernan is fifth in the all-time Irish record books for the women's 400 metres.

She is married to Irish Olympic race walker Rob Heffernan, with whom she has a son, Cathal, who is a footballer.

References

External links
 IAAF Profile
 Women's 4x400m relay team

1982 births
Living people
Athletes (track and field) at the 2012 Summer Olympics
Olympic athletes of Ireland
Sportspeople from Cork (city)
Irish female sprinters
Olympic female sprinters